The following lists events that happened during 1948 in Chile.

Incumbents
President of Chile: Gabriel González Videla

Events

February 
18 February - The Base General Bernardo O'Higgins Riquelme is inaugurated, one of the first of Chile in Antarctica.
25 February - The United Nations Economic and Social Council creates, under resolution 106 five regional economic commissions, whose objective is to help and collaborate with the governments of the respective territories in the investigation and analysis of regional and national economic issues. One of the five regional economic commissions was the Economic Commission for Latin America (in 1984 it was extended to the Caribbean), whose headquarters will be located in the city of Santiago.

September 
 3 September – The Law of Permanent Defense of Democracy banning the Communist Party of Chile is passed.

December 
3 December - comes into force the Law of Permanent Defense of Democracy.

Births
3 May – Mauricio Pesutic
12 July – Claudio Elgueta
23 August – Gastón Castro
6 October – José Piñera

Deaths
25 February – Juan Esteban Montero (b. 1879)

References 

 
Years of the 20th century in Chile
Chile